Mače may refer to: 
Mače, Croatia, a village and municipality in Krapina-Zagorje County in Croatia
Mače, Slovenia, a village in the Municipality of Preddvor in the Upper Carniola region of Slovenia

hr:Mače
it:Mače
nl:Mače